India competed in the 2012 Summer Paralympics in London, United Kingdom, from 29 August to 9 September 2012.

Competitors

Medallists

Athletics

Selected team of 5 athletes

Men’s Field Events

Powerlifting

Selected team of 3 athletes. 

Men

Shooting

Swimming

Sharath Gayakwad is the sole representative of India in the swimming event of the Games. He earned the berth in 100 m breaststroke – SB8 event after winning a bronze medal in the Asian Para Games in Guangzhou, China. Gayakwad started his training for the Games under coach Mel Tantrum in Perth, Australia. 

Men

See also
Summer Paralympic disability classification
India at the Paralympics
India at the 2012 Summer Olympics

References

Nations at the 2012 Summer Paralympics
2012
Summer Paralympics